Frédéric Chopin wrote his Trois nouvelles études ("three new studies") for piano in 1839, as a contribution to "Méthode des méthodes de piano", a piano instruction book by Ignaz Moscheles and François-Joseph Fétis. They are often erroneously described as posthumous. These études are less technical than the composer's Op. 10 and 25 and retain Chopin's original formula for harmonic and structural balance.

The Études 

 The first of the Trois nouvelles études is an intimate piece in F minor. It develops students' facility with 3-on-4 polyrhythms.
 The melody of the second étude in A major sits atop a series of chords in the right hand with a simple bass in the left hand. It develops students' facility with 2-on-3 polyrhythms.
 The third and last étude, in D major, is the most technically challenging in this collection. It develops independence of voices and articulation in the right hand, with the upper melodic line quite legato over a staccato alto accompaniment. Some of the reaches required between the alto and soprano lines may be difficult for pianists with smaller hands.

References

External links 
 Chopin, Trois Nouvelles Études, B. 130 Sheet music (with introductory note) at Musopen
 
 Details, Carnegie Hall Data Lab
 No. 1, No. 2, No. 3 played by Alfred Cortot on YouTube
 No. 1, No. 2, No. 3 played by Claudio Arrau on YouTube

Études by Frédéric Chopin
1839 compositions

Compositions in F minor
Compositions in A-flat major
Compositions in D-flat major